Papilio blumei, the peacock or green swallowtail, is a butterfly of the family Papilionidae. It is found only on the Indonesian island of Sulawesi. It is sometimes confused with the more widespread P. palinurus, but that species is smaller and has mostly black tails (in P. blumei, the upper surface of the tails is mostly bluish green).

The colours on the wings of some of these butterflies are metallic and are eye catching especially when viewed from a particular angle.

The remarkable feature of this butterfly's wing is that it contains rows of very small concave surfaces that reflect light in many ways. For instance, the centre of the concave surface reflects a yellow-green light and the edges reflect a blue light.

At the centre of the concavity, light is reflected directly but when light hits the edges, it bounces off into forming many layers, which amplifies and rotates the waves of light.

The final blend is known as structural colour due to the complexity by which it is produced.

Technological inspiration
Researchers have taken about ten years to recreate a simplified replica of the surface of the butterfly's wing. They hope that such technology will result in bank notes and credit cards that are difficult to forge and also that it will lead to solar cells being more efficient at gathering energy from the sun.

Yet it is challenging to duplicate the surface of a butterfly's wing. Professor Ullrich Steiner of Cambridge University's Nanoscience Centre states that, "Despite the detailed scientific understanding of optics, the astonishingly varied colour palette found in nature often surpasses the optical effects that can be generated by technological means".

Subspecies
There are two recognised subspecies:
Papilio blumei blumei (northern Sulawesi)
Papilio blumei fruhstorferi Röber, 1897 (southern Sulawesi)

Protection
It is protected in Bantimurung – Bulusaraung National Park.

References

Other reading
Erich Bauer and Thomas Frankenbach, 1998 Schmetterlinge der Erde, Butterflies of the world Part I (1), Papilionidae Papilionidae I: Papilio, Subgenus Achillides, Bhutanitis, Teinopalpus. Edited by Erich Bauer and Thomas Frankenbach. Keltern: Goecke & Evers; Canterbury: Hillside Books

External links

Butterflycorner.net

Butterflies described in 1836
blumei
Butterflies of Indonesia
Taxa named by Jean Baptiste Boisduval